This is list of Indonesian desserts. In Indonesia, desserts are called as pencuci mulut or hidangan penutup. The style of cooking and foods in Indonesian cuisine—including desserts—are local cuisine with Arabs, Chinese, Indian, and European (especially Dutch, Portuguese, and Spanish) cuisine influences, adapted to local tastes, local palates and indigenous ingredients. Indonesian desserts are very diverse and rich.

A

B

C

D

E

G

K

L

M

N

O

P

R

S

T

V

W

See also

Cuisine of Indonesia
Dessert
Kue
List of desserts
List of Indonesian beverages
List of Indonesian dishes
List of Indonesian snacks
List of Indonesian soups
Street food of Indonesia

References

External links

 Eating the Indonesian way
 Indonesian Recipes
 Indonesian food, recipes and culinary
 Good Indonesian Heritage Food and Cuisine

Indonesia
Deserts